Diego Luri (born September 27, 1985) is a Brazilian actor, singer, journalist and writer, who gained prominence by playing the protagonist of the Brazilian version of the show Shrek the Musical. For his performance, he was nominated for the Bibi Ferreira Award in 2014. He was also in the Brazilian cast of other musical theater shows, such as Summer: The Donna Summer Musical, Beauty and the Beast, Cinderella, The Phantom of the Opera, Romeo and Juliet – to the sound of Marisa Monte, Rodgers & Hammerstein's Cinderella, The Fantasticks, My Fair Lady, Sister Act, Os Saltimbancos Trapalhões – O Musical and Porquinhos – O Musical.

Early life and career 
Born and raised in the Rio neighborhood of Campo Grande, Diego wanted to be an artist since childhood, but only began his experience in his youth, singing in church choirs. He first graduated as a journalist, in 2009, when he was invited to present the TV show Vida e Missão, broadcast by Band Rio and later by CNT. He was also a webreporter for Rede TV and, still working as a reporter, began his artistic training as an actor at Casa das Artes de Laranjeiras (CAL). He was part of the vocal group Réus Confessos, along with other musical theater artists. In 2011, the actor received the award for Best Supporting Actor at the Rio de Janeiro City Theater Festival for Beauty and the Beast. His first major role was in the Broadway show Shrek – O Musical, in its Brazilian production, which ran in the cities of Rio de Janeiro and São Paulo and toured throughout 2014. For his performance as the protagonist of the show, he was nominated for the Bibi Ferreira Award in the Breakthrough Actor category.

Shrek – The Musical 
In 2012, Diego was selected from more than 2,000 candidates and unseated more than 1,200 actors to play the protagonist of the show Shrek – The Musical in Brazil. At the time, it was said that Tiago Abravanel would play the character, but according to the producer, the invitation never took place. The actor Rodrigo Sant'anna, invited to play Donkey in the play, was one of the main supporters of the casting of Diego Luri for the role. As the ogre, Diego made his debut in major musicals and had wide media coverage. His costume weighed over 20 kg and the makeover used to take three hours to complete. His performance received good reviews and led him to be nominated for Breakthrough Actor of that year at the Bibi Ferreira award.

Stage credits

Books 

 Caos Entre Nós ou A Tragédia do Hábito / Uma Canção Pra Você (2017)
 Contos e Crônicas para Crianças (2011)

References

External links 
 Diego Luri Website

1985 births
Brazilian male stage actors
Brazilian male musical theatre actors
Brazilian male television actors
Brazilian male film actors
Brazilian male soap opera actors
Living people